Jervis Joscelyn Percy (born 21 July 1928) is a British modern pentathlete. He competed at the 1952 Summer Olympics.

References

1928 births
Living people
British male modern pentathletes
Olympic modern pentathletes of Great Britain
Modern pentathletes at the 1952 Summer Olympics
Sportspeople from Alexandria